HMS Tilbury was a 60-gun fourth-rate ship of the line of the Royal Navy, built at Chatham Dockyard to the dimensions of the 1719 Establishment, and launched on 2 June 1733.

The Tilbury was part of Vice-Admiral Edward Vernon's fleet and took part in the expedition to Cartagena de Indias during the War of Jenkins' Ear.

Tilbury was accidentally burnt in 1742.

Notes

References

Lavery, Brian (2003) The Ship of the Line - Volume 1: The development of the battlefleet 1650-1850. Conway Maritime Press. .
Michael Phillips. Tilbury (60) (1733). Michael Phillips' Ships of the Old Navy. Retrieved 1 August 2008.

Ships of the line of the Royal Navy
1730s ships
Maritime incidents in 1742